Orlaka is a small settlement south of Šumberk in the Municipality of Trebnje in eastern Slovenia. The area is part of the traditional region of Lower Carniola. The municipality is now included in the Southeast Slovenia Statistical Region.

Name
Orlaka was attested in historical sources as Horlach in 1378, Orlakchen in 1390, Arlakchen in 1440, and Arlach in 1448, among other spellings.

References

External links

Orlaka at Geopedia

Populated places in the Municipality of Trebnje